
Year 235 (CCXXXV) was a common year starting on Thursday (link will display the full calendar) of the Julian calendar. At the time, it was known as the Year of the Consulship of Severus and Quintianus (or, less frequently, year 988 Ab urbe condita). The denomination 235 for this year has been used since the early medieval period, when the Anno Domini calendar era became the prevalent method in Europe for naming years.

Events 
 By place 

 Roman Empire 
 March 22 – Emperor Severus Alexander and his mother Iulia Mamaea are murdered by their own soldiers. The soldiers proclaim Maximinus Thrax as emperor. The Severan dynasty ends, marking the beginning of the Crisis of the Third Century.

 By topic 

 Religion 
 September 28 – Pope Pontian resigns, the first to abdicate, because he and Hippolytus, church leader of Rome, are exiled to the mines of Sardinia. Emperor Maximinus persecutes the Christians.
 November 21 – Anterus succeeds Pontian as the nineteenth pope of Rome.

Births 
 Sun Xiu, Chinese emperor of the Eastern Wu state (d. 264)

Deaths 
 March 22 – Severus Alexander, Roman emperor (b. 208)
 Cao Gun, Chinese imperial prince
 Chen Zhen (or Xiaoqi), Chinese official and politician
 Gaius Petronius Magnus, Roman consul and usurper
 Guo Nüwang, Chinese emperres
 Hippolytus, Christian theologian and writer (b. 170)
 Julia Avita Mamaea, mother of Severus Alexander (b. 180)
 Tiberius Julius Cotys III (or Kotys), Roman client king
 Tiberius Julius Rhescuporis IV, Roman client king
 Titius Quartinus, Roman governor and usurper
 Xin Pi (or Zuozhi), Chinese official and politician
 Yang Yi (or Weigong), Chinese official and adviser

References